Robert Bradbrook (born 1965) is an English filmmaker and animator.  He began his career as a cartographer before turning to making films.  He received a Masters in Art degree in Electronics and Graphics from Coventry University.  His films include Home Road Movies, which is said  to be largely autobiographical.  Home Road Movies was nominated as Best Animated Short at the 55th British Academy Film Awards and received the Grand Prize at the 2002 Ottawa International Animation Festival. Bradbrook currently resides in London.

References

External links

Robert Bradbrook's Official Homepage
"Home Road Movies" at Zanimation

Living people
English animators
British animated film directors
Artists from London
Alumni of Coventry University
English cartographers
1965 births